Vasileia Zachou (born ) is a Greek group rhythmic gymnast. She represented her nation at international competitions. 

She participated at the 2012 Summer Olympics in London.
She also competed at world championships, including at the 2011  World Rhythmic Gymnastics Championships.

References

External links

1994 births
Living people
Greek rhythmic gymnasts
Place of birth missing (living people)
Gymnasts at the 2012 Summer Olympics
Olympic gymnasts of Greece
Sportspeople from Larissa